Chrysanthia is a genus of beetles belonging to the family Oedemeridae subfamily Nacerdinae.

Species
 Chrysanthia cyprica Pic, 1920
 Chrysanthia flavipes Reitter, 1889
 Chrysanthia geniculata (W. Schmidt, 1846)
 Chrysanthia hamata Vázquez, 1989
 Chrysanthia reitteri Seidlitz, 1899
 Chrysanthia superba Reitter, 1872
 Chrysanthia varipes Kiesenwetter, 1861
 Chrysanthia viridissima (Linnaeus, 1758)

References
 Vazquez, X. A. - 1989 - El genero Chrysanthia Schmidt en la Peninsula Iberica (Col., Oedemeridae) - Elytron, 3: 125-136
 Vazquez, X. A. - 2002 - European Fauna of Oedemeridae - Argania editio, Barcelona, 179 pp.

External links
 Biolib
 Fauna Europaea

Oedemeridae
Tenebrionoidea genera